Hold the Back Page is a British television series which originally aired on BBC One between 12 November 1985 and 28 January 1986. A sports reporter transfers from a broadsheet to a tabloid.

Main cast
 David Warner as Ken Wordsworth
 Eric Allan as Reg
 Gil Brailey as Alison
 Lee Whitlock as Charlie Wordsworth
 David Horovitch as Russell de Vries
 Peter-Hugo Daly as Steve Stevens
 Richard Ireson as  Frank McNab
 Tilly Vosburgh as Ruby

References

Bibliography
 Vahimagi, Tise . British Television: An Illustrated Guide. Oxford University Press, 1996.

External links
 

BBC television dramas
1985 British television series debuts
1986 British television series endings
1980s British drama television series
English-language television shows